The East Northumberland League (ENL) was a football league that existed in Northumberland from 1894 to 1910.

Overview
The ENL was made up of teams chiefly from the mining areas of Northumberland. However, the teams had chronic instability, with no team playing in the league for the full period of the league's existence, and more than half lasting for only a single year or less. At least two champions of the league, Ashington and Blyth Spartans, are still in existence however. Both of these teams went on to join the Northern Football Alliance shortly after their successes in the ENL.

Champions

References 

 
Football in Northumberland
1894 establishments in England
1910 disestablishments in England
Defunct football leagues in England
Sports leagues established in 1894
Sports leagues disestablished in 1910